Astilbe glaberrima, called the florist's spiraea and smooth rock astilbe, is a species of flowering plant in the genus Astilbe, native to Yakushima Island, Japan. Some authorities have it as a subspecies of Astilbe japonica, Astilbe japonica subsp. glaberrima. Its dwarf variety Astilbe glaberrima var. saxatilis has gained the Royal Horticultural Society's Award of Garden Merit.

Varieties
The following varieties are currently accepted:

Astilbe glaberrima var. glaberrima
Astilbe glaberrima var. saxatilis (Nakai) H.Ohba

References

glaberrima
Endemic flora of Japan
Plants described in 1922